Rakibul Hasan (born 11 December 1988) is a Bangladeshi-born Italian cricketer who represents Italy cricket team. He made his List A debut for Kala Bagan Krira Chakra in the Dhaka Premier Division Cricket League on 15 September 2013. In September 2017, he played for the Italian cricket team in the 2017 ICC World Cricket League Division Five tournament.

In September 2018, he was the joint-leading wicket-taker for Italy in Group B of the 2018–19 ICC World Twenty20 Europe Qualifier tournament, with eight dismissals in five matches.

In May 2019, he was named in Italy's squad for their Twenty20 International (T20I) series against Germany in the Netherlands. He made his T20I debut for Italy against Germany on 25 May 2019. The same month, he was named in Italy's squad for the Regional Finals of the 2018–19 ICC T20 World Cup Europe Qualifier tournament in Guernsey. In November 2019, he was named in Italy's squad for the Cricket World Cup Challenge League B tournament in Oman.

References

External links
 

1988 births
Living people
Bangladeshi cricketers
Italian cricketers
Italy Twenty20 International cricketers
Kala Bagan Krira Chakra cricketers
Cricketers from Dhaka